Southern is an English surname. Notable people with the surname include:
 Caleb Southern (born 1969), American music producer
 Edwin Southern (born 1938), English molecular biologist
 Eileen Southern (1920–2002), American musicologist
 Jeri Southern (1926–1991, born as Genevieve Hering), American jazz pianist and singer
 John Southern (cricketer, born 1952) (born 1952), English first-class cricketer.
 John Southern (engineer) (c.1758–1815), English engineer,
 J. T. Southern (born 1964), American professional wrestler
 Keith Southern (born 1981), English footballer
 Lauren Southern (born 1995), Canadian political activist
 Richard Southern (theatre designer) (1903–1989), British theatre designer 
 R. W. Southern (1912–2001), British medieval historian 
 Sarah Southern (born 1980), British businesswoman and politician
 Steve Southern (born 1982), Australian rugby player
 Terry Southern (1924–1995), American writer

See also
Sothern

English-language surnames